Katanin p80 WD40-containing subunit B1 is a protein that in humans is encoded by the KATNB1 gene.

Microtubules, polymers of alpha and beta tubulin subunits, form the mitotic spindle of a dividing cell and help to organize membranous organelles during interphase. Katanin is a heterodimer that consists of a 60 kDa ATPase (p60 subunit A 1) and an 80 kDa accessory protein (p80 subunit B 1). The p60 subunit acts to sever and disassemble microtubules, while the p80 subunit targets the enzyme to the centrosome. Katanin is a member of the AAA family of ATPases. KATNB1 is associated with microlissencephaly.

References

Further reading

External links